Borja Vidal Fernández Fernández (born 25 December 1981) is a Spanish-Qatari handball player for Al-Qiyada and the Qatari national team.

He formerly played professionally basketball in Spain until 2005, when he changed to handball.

In 2013, Fernández got the Qatari passport for playing with their national team.

He competed in handball at the 2016 Summer Olympics.

Club career as basketball player
1999–2001 Joventut Badalona (Spain 4th and Spain 1st)
2001–2002 Club Melilla Baloncesto (Spain 2nd)
2002–2003 Bilbao Basket (Spain 2nd)
2003–2004 Basket Napoli (Italy 1st)
2004–2005 CAI Zaragoza (Spain 2nd)

Gallery

References

External links
 Basketball profile at ACB.com
 
 
 
 

1981 births
Living people
Spanish male handball players
Spanish men's basketball players
Liga ACB players
Joventut Badalona players
Melilla Baloncesto players
Bilbao Basket players
Basket Zaragoza players
People from Valdés, Asturias
Sportspeople from Asturias
Naturalised citizens of Qatar
Asian Games medalists in handball
Handball players at the 2014 Asian Games
Handball players at the 2016 Summer Olympics
Qatari male handball players
Olympic handball players of Qatar
Asian Games gold medalists for Qatar
Medalists at the 2014 Asian Games